Sabine Bau (born 19 July 1969) is a former German foil fencer.

Biography
Sabine Bau fought for the Fencing-Club Tauberbischofsheim. She won five medals at four different Olympic Games between 1988 and 2000.

External links
 Profile on fie.ch

References

1969 births
Living people
Sportspeople from Würzburg
German female fencers
Olympic fencers of West Germany
Olympic fencers of Germany
Olympic gold medalists for West Germany
Olympic silver medalists for West Germany
Olympic silver medalists for Germany
Olympic bronze medalists for Germany
Fencers at the 1988 Summer Olympics
Fencers at the 1992 Summer Olympics
Fencers at the 1996 Summer Olympics
Fencers at the 2000 Summer Olympics
Olympic medalists in fencing
Medalists at the 1988 Summer Olympics
Medalists at the 1992 Summer Olympics
Medalists at the 1996 Summer Olympics
Medalists at the 2000 Summer Olympics
20th-century German women